Hydaticus incertus, is a species of predaceous diving beetle found in India, Bhutan, Myanmar, Nepal, Sri Lanka, China, Malaysia, and Thailand.

References 

Dytiscidae
Insects of Sri Lanka
Insects described in 1888